Vivian Chiodetti (31 May 1903 – 17 January 1942) was an Indian cricketer. He played one first-class match for Hyderabad in 1931/32. He was killed in action in Burma during World War II.

See also
 List of Hyderabad cricketers
 List of cricketers who were killed during military service

References

External links
 

1903 births
1942 deaths
Indian cricketers
Hyderabad cricketers
Cricketers from Rawalpindi
Indian Army personnel killed in World War II